Clayton M. Miller (January 19, 1899 – June 12, 1973) was an American football and basketball coach.  He was the tenth head football coach at Eastern Illinois State Teachers College—now known as Eastern Illinois University—in Charleston, Illinois, serving for one season, in 1942, and compiling a record of 1–7.  Miller was also the head basketball coach at Eastern Illinois for the 1942–43 season, tallying a mark of 8–10.  A graduate of Knox College in Galesburg, Illinois, Miller coach football at Westville High School in Westville, Illinois from 1925 to 1940, amassing a record of 105–28.

Head coaching record

College football

References

External links
 

1899 births
1973 deaths
Eastern Illinois Panthers football coaches
Eastern Illinois Panthers men's basketball coaches
High school football coaches in Illinois
Knox College (Illinois) alumni
People from Bureau County, Illinois
Coaches of American football from Illinois
Basketball coaches from Illinois